The Sespe Condor Sanctuary is a  wildlife refuge in the Topatopa Mountains, in northeastern Ventura County, California. It is within the Sespe Wilderness in the southern Los Padres National Forest.

History
The United States Forest Service established the Sespe Condor Sanctuary in 1947 for the California condor, an endangered species which is the largest living bird in North America.

On January 14, 1992, two captive-bred California condors and two Andean condors were released into the Sespe Condor Sanctuary, overlooking the Sespe Creek, near Fillmore, California. This was done by the U.S. Fish and Wildlife Service's Hopper Mountain National Wildlife Refuge Complex, the lead office for the California Condor Recovery Program. These captive-bred condors thrived in the wild and have begun to reproduce freely.

Before the sanctuary was established, numerous condors were killed by power line collisions. In order to circumvent this mishap, the captive condors were treated with "mock power poles" through the power pole aversion program. These poles emitted mild shocks when landed upon. They quickly learned to avoid power poles, which has significantly reduced their mortality rate.

Future plans
Currently the California Condor Recovery Program is in effect in California, Arizona, and Baja. There are nearly 450 California condors in the world, with more than 275 flying free in the wild. California has four release sites, of which the Sespe Condor Sanctuary is one. With the advent of more natural condor births, more release sites are in the works.

See also
 Sespe Creek
 Fishes of Sespe Creek, California
 National Wildlife Refuges in California
 Topatopa Mountains

References

External links
California Condor Recovery Program at the Hopper Mountain National Wildlife Refuge Complex

Bird sanctuaries of the United States
Nature reserves in California
Los Padres National Forest
Ojai Ranger District, Los Padres National Forest
Topatopa Mountains
Protected areas of Ventura County, California
Protected areas established in 1947
1947 establishments in California
Protected areas of Southern California